The Fifteenth Texas Legislature met from April 18 to August 21, 1876, in its regular session. All members of the House of Representatives and about half of the members of the Senate were elected in 1875.

Sessions
15th Regular session: April 18 – August 21, 1876

Party summary

Officers

Senate
 Lieutenant Governor
 Richard Bennett Hubbard, Jr., Democrat
 President pro tempore
 Wells Thompson, Democrat

House of Representatives
 Speaker of the House
 Thomas Reuben Bonner, Democrat

Members
Members of the Fifteenth Texas Legislature as of the beginning of the Regular Session, April 18, 1876:

Senate

House of Representatives

Robert D. Allison
Benjamin M. Baker
Decimus et Ultimus Barziza
Thomas Reuben Bonner
John Hughes Cochran
Nicholas Henry Darnell
Thomas Mason Dennis
Caleb Jackson Garrison
John Summerfield Griffith
William H. Holland
Alexander Horton
William W. Lang
Norton Moses
George Pickett
Meshack Roberts
William Long Rogers
Henry Sneed
Elias Charles Stuart
Thomas Towles
John Quitman Wall
Allen W. Wilder
Charles Louis Wurzbach
Logan Henderson McCorkle, Sulphur Springs

 Representative Wilder won a closely contested election, but House Democrats contended that some votes were illegal and seated his Democratic opponent instead.

Membership changes

 Sworn in at the beginning of the Sixteenth Texas Legislature.

External links

15 Texas Legislature
1876 in Texas
1876 U.S. legislative sessions